Roy A. Jodrey was a bulk carrier owned by Algoma Central Railway. The ship was launched and entered service in 1965, one of four ships constructed for the company to access ports on the Great Lakes and Saint Lawrence Seaway too small for use by the larger lake freighters. On 20 November 1974, Roy A. Jodrey struck Pullman Shoal in the St. Lawrence River in Alexandria Bay, New York. The vessel made it to the United States Coast Guard Station at Wellesley Island and tied up. No attempt to salvage the ship was made, but Algoma did try to salvage the vessel's cargo of iron ore, which led to the death of a diver. Roy A. Jodrey became a technical scuba diving site, whose difficulty has led to the deaths of a some of those who have attempted it.

Description
The ship had a gross register tonnage (GRT) of 16,154 and a deadweight tonnage (DWT) of 22,750. The ship was designed to access ports on the Great Lakes and Saint Lawrence Seaway that the larger lake freighters could not. The ship had a crew of 29.

Construction and career
The bulk carrier was ordered from Collingwood Shipyards Ltd. by Algoma Central Railway. The vessel was built at their yard in Collingwood, Ontario with the yard number 186. The ship was launched on 9 September 1965 and completed in November. Roy A. Jodrey was the first of four ships built to this design. The ship was registered in Collingwood and flagged for Canada. The main cargoes of Roy A. Jodrey were ore, coal and limestone, but was also used to transport road salt, bentonite, potash, bauxite and coke.

Sinking
On 20 November 1974, Roy A. Jodrey was transporting iron ore pellets from Sept-Îles, Quebec to Detroit, Michigan when the ship struck buoy no. 194 off Wellesley Island near Alexandria Bay, New York in the Saint Lawrence River. The buoy tore a hole in the ship's hull, which the crew attempted to patch. Roy A. Jodrey continued on to the United States Coast Guard Station at Wellesley Island, where the vessel ran up on Pullman Shoal. The ballast pumps were unable to keep the ship afloat and the ship slid off the shoal, rolled over on its side and sank on 21 November 1974 with no loss of life.

The ship was declared unsalvageable and Roy A. Jodreys registry was closed on 7 October 1975. When the ship sank, it had aboard  of fuel. Officials were initially concerned the fuel tanks would rupture and oil was spotted seeping from one of the ventilators. At the time, this was considered acceptable. Algoma Central Railway replaced Roy A. Jodrey with Algosea, a German-flagged bulk carrier.

In 2002, a cleanup project headed by the New York State Department of Environment Conservation removed some of the remaining oil. The wreck is a popular destination for technical scuba divers. It is considered a difficult wreck, with some divers losing their lives while diving the wreck.

Notes

Citations

Sources
 
 

Shipwrecks of the Saint Lawrence River
Maritime incidents in 1974
1965 ships
Algoma Central Marine
Great Lakes freighters